"Darlin' I" is a song by American singer Vanessa Williams, released as the fourth and final single from her debut studio album, The Right Stuff (1988).

Music video
The music video for the song is filmed in black and white based on the I Love Lucy show, directed by Alek Keshishian.

Charts

References

1980s ballads
1988 songs
1989 singles
Black-and-white music videos
Contemporary R&B ballads
Music videos directed by Alek Keshishian
Songs written by Rex Salas
Vanessa Williams songs
Wing Records singles